Adewumi Adeyanju (born 17 August 1990) also known as Biesloaded, is a Nigerian entertainment blogger, singer and entrepreneur who is known as singer Zlatan's personal blogger.

Early life and education 

Adewumi Adeyanju was born and raised in Ilesa, Osun State.

He attended Funto International Academy and then completed O'levels at Pre-Varsity School Centre, Ilesa.

Career 
He signed a public relations deal with Zlatan Ibile's Zanku Records. Biesloaded has worked as a PR manager for Naira Marley, Davido, Zlatan, MohBad and Rexxie.

On November 9, 2022, Adeyanju announced the release of a new single featuring Nigerian rapper, singer, songwriter, record and executive YBNL Nation boss Olamide baddo.

Biesloaded released the song 'Blogger Blogger' in 2020 with Mohbad, a singer and songwriter formerly signed to Marlian Records, and Kabex due to his nickname as a blogger. Adeyanju is currently the public relations officer for Zanku Records.

Controversies 
Adewumi Adeyanju, Moses and his companions Zlatan and Naira Marley were detained by the Economic and Financial Crimes Commission for fraud on May 10, 2019. The arrest was made the day after Marley's release of the controversial music video for 'Am I A Yahoo Boy'. He was released four days later due to the lack of evidence.

Discography

Singles 
 'Blogger Blogger' (featuring Mohbad) (2021)
 'Ma Gbo Remix (featuring Payan Boi X DJ Shizzy  X Zlatan ibile )'
 'Influencer (featuring Sunkkeysnoop)'

References

Living people
1990 births
Nigerian Christians